Lars Vogt (8 September 1970 – 5 September 2022) was a German classical pianist, conductor and academic teacher. Noted by The New York Times for his interpretations of Brahms, Vogt performed as a soloist with major orchestras, including the Berlin Philharmonic. He was the music director of the Orchestre de chambre de Paris at the time of his death and also served as the music director of the Royal Northern Sinfonia. He ran a festival of chamber music, Spannungen, from 1998, and succeeded his teacher Karl-Heinz Kämmerling as professor of piano at the Musikhochschule Hannover.

Life and career 
Vogt was born in Düren on 8 September 1970 and began taking piano lessons at the age of six. He studied at the Hochschule für Musik und Theater Hannover with Karl-Heinz Kämmerling. He rose to prominence after winning second prize at the 1990 Leeds International Piano Competition and went on to give major concerto and recital performances. His first major recordings were with the City of Birmingham Symphony Orchestra conducted by Simon Rattle, first in 1992 Schumann's Piano Concerto and Grieg's Piano Concerto. On the record cover, pianist and conductor appeared in informal clothes, which was new at the time. They went on to record Beethoven's Piano Concertos Nos. 1 and 2 in 1995. Vogt first played with the Royal Concertgebouw Orchestra, the Vienna Philharmonic, the London Symphony Orchestra, Chicago Symphony Orchestra and Boston Symphony Orchestra. He first appeared with the New York Philharmonic and Lorin Maazel in the 2003/04 season. He had a close relationship with the Berlin Philharmonic who made him their first pianist in residence, again with Rattle. Vogt recorded commercially for such labels as EMI/Warner Classics, Avi Music, and Ondine.

He was a dedicated chamber musician, focused on the repertoire of music from the classical period and the romantic era. He also collaborated with composers such as Volker David Kirchner, Thomas Larcher, Kryštof Mařatka and Erkki-Sven Tüür. He founded the festival Spannungen for chamber music in Heimbach (Eifel) in the hydro-electric power plant Kraftwerk Heimbach in 1998. Many of the concerts with friends were recorded live. Reviewer Jan Brachmann from the FAZ noted that Dvořák's Dumky Trio was played by violinist Christian Tetzlaff, cellist Tanja Tetzlaff and Vogt, as if the players took time for sinking together into moods ("für das gemeinsame Versinken in Stimmungen"). Vogt gave his last concert there, playing on 26 June 2022 with Christian Tetzlaff, Barbara Buntrock and Tanja Tetzlaff the Piano Quartet No. 3 by Johannes Brahms.

Vogt founded the initiative , a network of classical musicians who play in school lessons to provide children a personal close meeting with musicians and their music.

After Kämmerling's death in 2012, he succeeded him as professor of piano at the Musikhochschule Hannover.

Conductor 
In May 2014, the Royal Northern Sinfonia announced the appointment of Vogt as its next music director, his first post as a conductor, effective September 2015. Vogt served as music director until 2020, and had the title of Principal Artistic Partner with the orchestra. In October 2019, the Orchestre de chambre de Paris (OCP) announced the appointment of Vogt as its new music director, effective with the 2020–2021 season, with an initial contract of 3 years.  In December 2021, the OCP announced an extension of Vogt's contract through June 2025.  He held the OCP post until his death.

Private life 
Vogt was first married to the Russian composer Tatjana Komarova. He lived with his second wife, violinist Anna Reszniak, and three children in Nuremberg, Bavaria. In February 2021, Vogt was diagnosed with cancer of the throat and liver, continuing to play while receiving treatment, and recording between rounds of chemotherapy.

Vogt died in a clinic in Erlangen in the presence of his family on 5 September 2022, three days before his 52nd birthday.

Awards 
In 2004, Vogt was awarded both the Brahms-Preis and the Echo Klassik. That year, a recording of the Piano Trios by Brahms with Christian Tetzlaff and Tanja Tetzlaff was nominated for a Grammy Award in the category Best Chamber Music/Small Ensemble Performance. Vogt was awarded an Opus Klassik in 2021.

Discography 
Gramophone has regarded several of Vogt's recordings as benchmarks, as solo pianist, chamber musician and soloist and conductor with orchestra. Many recordings were made live at the Spannungen festival by label Avi (of CAvi), marked by the festival's name in the label column.

References

External links
 
 
 
 Lars Vogt (management) Askonas Holt
 "Facing the music": Lars Vogt (interview) The Guardian, 13 July 2015

1970 births
2022 deaths
21st-century German male classical pianists
21st-century German male musicians
Deaths from esophageal cancer
Deaths from cancer in Germany
German classical pianists
Hochschule für Musik, Theater und Medien Hannover alumni
Male classical pianists
People from Düren
Prize-winners of the Leeds International Pianoforte Competition